Michigan's 17th Senate district is one of 38 districts in the Michigan Senate. The 17th district was created by the 1850 Michigan Constitution, as the 1835 constitution only permitted a maximum of eight senate districts. It has been represented by Republican Jonathan Lindsey since 2023, succeeding fellow Republican Dale Zorn.

Geography
District 17 encompasses all of Branch, Cass, and St. Joseph counties, as well as parts of Berrien, Calhoun, Hillsdale, and Jackson counties.

2011 Apportionment Plan
District 17, as dictated by the 2011 Apportionment Plan, covered Lenawee and Monroe Counties on the outskirts of Detroit and Toledo, including the communities of Monroe, Adrian, Tecumseh, Carleton, Dundee, Hudson, Morenci, Blissfield, Clinton, Bedford Township, Monroe Township, Frenchtown Township, Berlin Township, Madison Township, and part of Milan.

The district was located entirely within Michigan's 7th congressional district, and overlapped with the 17th, 56th, 57th, and 65th districts of the Michigan House of Representatives. It bordered the state of Ohio, and shared a water border with Canada via Lake Erie.

List of senators

Recent election results

2018

2014

Federal and statewide results in District 17

Historical district boundaries

Notes

References 

17
Lenawee County, Michigan
Monroe County, Michigan